Calliomorpha cyanoptera is a species of beetle in the family Cerambycidae, and the only species in the genus Calliomorpha. It was described by Lane in 1973.

References

Calliini
Beetles described in 1973
Monotypic Cerambycidae genera